The House of Commons Standing Committee on Fisheries and Oceans (FOPO) is a standing committee of the House of Commons of Canada, founded in the 35th Parliament.

Mandate
The mandate and management of Department of Fisheries and Oceans and its subsidiary agencies:
The Freshwater Fish Marketing Corporation
The Atlantic Fisheries Licence Appeal Board
The Pacific Region Licence Appeal Board
Closed Containment Salmon Aquaculture
Snow Crab Industry in Atlantic Canada and Quebec

Membership

Subcommittees
Subcommittee on Agenda and Procedure (SFOP)

References
Standing Committee on Fisheries and Oceans (FOPO)

Fisheries